Sparnopolius confusus is a species of bee flies, insects in the family Bombyliidae.

It measures 6-9 mm. It is found in most of the United States and in part of Mexico. It isknown to be a parasitoid of June beetles, Phyllophaga

References

External links

 

Bombyliidae
Articles created by Qbugbot
Insects described in 1824